Guadalupe Grande Aguirre (30 May 1965 – 2 January 2021) was a Spanish poet. She had a degree in social anthropology from the Complutense University of Madrid.

Biography
Guadalupe was the daughter of writer Félix Grande. She was a cousin of poet Carlos Martínez Aguirre. A literary critic and teacher, she wrote El libro de Lilit in 1995, La llave de la niebla in 2003, and Mapas de cera in 2006.

Bibliography

Anthologies
De varia España (1997)
Ellas tienen la palabra (1997)
Poesía Ultimísima (1997)
Norte y Sur de la poesía Iberoamericana (1998)
Milenio (1999)
Diálogo de la lengua. Pasar la página, poetas para el nuevo milenio (2000)
Aldea Poética II (2000)
Mujeres de carne y verso (2001)
La voz y la escritura - 80 propuestas poéticas desde los viernes de la Cacharrería (2001)
Monográfico sobre poesía femenina española de la Revista Zurgai (2004)
33 de Radio 3 (2004)
Hilanderas (2006)

Essays
El silencio en la obra de Juan Rulfo (1989)
Literatura azteca, flores en el tiempo (1989)
El flautista de Hamelin (1992)
Las piedras, Rulfo, el tiempo (Pedro Páramo y la escultura) (1994)
La identidad de los fragmentos (apuntes sobre poesía) (1997)
La mirada creadora (1998)
Concha Méndez: 'Con recuerdos de esperanzas y esperanzas de recuerdos''' (1998)El sendero de la inocencia (las referencias religiosas en la poesía de César Vallejo) (1998)El personaje poético de la postmodernidad (2005)La aldea de sal (2009)

Literary critiquesNo para de llover (1996)Sobre el mito, la propia vida (1997)El libro de Lilit (1997)La ciudad desvestida (2003)Postales de asombro (2003)Naufragios y derrotas'' (2003)

References

1965 births
2021 deaths
20th-century Spanish poets
21st-century Spanish poets
Spanish women poets
Writers from Madrid
Complutense University of Madrid alumni
Spanish literary critics
Women literary critics
20th-century Spanish women writers
21st-century Spanish women writers
Spanish women essayists
20th-century essayists
21st-century essayists
20th-century Spanish non-fiction writers
21st-century Spanish non-fiction writers